Federico Bicelli (born 5 February 1999) is an Italian Paralympic swimmer who won a medal at 2020 Summer Paralympics.

He won a silver medal at the World Para Swimming Championships and 10 medals at the IPC Swimming European Championships.

Career
Born in Brescia, Federico is suffering from a spinal cord injury, called spina bifida, which is why he approached swimming from an early age. Federico graduated in 2017 from the Abba Ballini commercial technical institute, now he attends the second year at the Catholic university with a computer address. Competitive swimming began in 2009 with the Polisportiva Bresciana No Frontiere sector Paralympic swimming. Specialized in 50m, 100m and 400m freestyle.

In 2017 he participated in the European youth championships in Genoa, winning a gold medal in the 100 backstrokes, a silver medal in the 400 freestyle and a bronze medal in the 100 freestyle.

In 2018 he participated in the European Championship in Dublin winning a gold medal in the 100 freestyle, a silver medal in the 100 backstroke, a bronze medal in the 50 freestyle and finally a gold medal in the relay 4X100 mixed.

References

External links 
 

1999 births
Living people
Paralympic swimmers of Italy
Medalists at the World Para Swimming European Championships
Swimmers at the 2020 Summer Paralympics
Medalists at the 2020 Summer Paralympics
Paralympic medalists in swimming
Paralympic bronze medalists for Italy
Italian male freestyle swimmers
Italian male backstroke swimmers
S7-classified Paralympic swimmers
S8-classified Paralympic swimmers
Medalists at the World Para Swimming Championships
21st-century Italian people